The Lexikon der indogermanischen Verben (LIV, "Lexicon of the Indo-European Verbs") is an etymological dictionary of the Proto-Indo-European (PIE) verb. The first edition appeared in 1998, edited by Helmut Rix. A second edition followed in 2001. The book may be seen as an update to the verb entries of the Indogermanisches etymologisches Wörterbuch (IEW) by Julius Pokorny. It was the first dictionary fully utilizing the modern three-laryngeal theory with reconstructions of Indo-European verbal roots.

== The LIVs hypothesis about aspect ==
The authors of the LIV assume a dichotomy between telic verbs (terminated: for example,  'to light up') and atelic verbs (ongoing: for example,  'to shine') in early stages of Proto-Indo-European. Before the daughter languages split off, aspect emerged as a new grammatical category.

Telic verbs were interpreted as aorist forms, and the missing present was formed with various suffixes (for example) and the nasal infix, all of which are supposed to come from old grammatical forms of uncertain meaning.

Atelic verbs were interpreted as present forms, and the missing aorist was formed with the suffix -s-, yielding the sigmatic aorist.

This hypothesis is used to explain various phenomena:
Some verbs in Indo-European languages form root presents (Latin  'I pull, I lead', from PIE ) and derived sigmatic aorists (perfect forms in Latin:  'I have pulled, I have led', pronounced dūksī, from ).

In addition to the present and the aorist, the following aspects are assumed:
Perfect
Causative-Iterative
Desiderative
Intensive (repetition)
Fientive (onset of a new state)
Essive (persistent state)

 Entries 
The lexical part contains for each verbal root
the conjectured meaning,
reconstructed stems with their reflexes in the daughter languages,
extensive footnotes (with references, remarks on alternative and dubious reconstructions, etc.),
the page number of the corresponding IEW entry.

 Indices 
The book includes
a regressive root index,
an index of reconstructed primary stems, sorted by aspect and formation rule,
an index of reflexes in the daughter languages, sorted by language.

 Reception and criticism 
Seebold claims insufficient evidence for roots reconstructed from a single daughter language. Helmut Rix insists in the preface to the second edition that the assessment of the evidence should be left to the reader.
Seebold also criticises some of the conjectured meanings. Rix calls this criticism basically legitimate.
Meier-Brügger tentatively calls the LIVs aspect hypothesis “adequate and capable of consensus”, without agreeing on all of the details of the analysis.
Fortson calls the LIV “[v]ery useful and up-to-date – though in various places controversial”, but does not elaborate on the controversial places.
Ringe states that the theories in Rix (what he terms the “Cowgill-Rix verb”) largely reflect current consensus, but implies that some of his phonological reconstructions may go beyond the consensus (in terms of being insufficiently “conservative”).

See also 
 Proto-Indo-European verb

Other PIE dictionaries and grammars
 Grundriß der vergleichenden Grammatik der indogermanischen Sprachen (published 1886–1916 by Karl Brugmann and Berthold Delbrück)
 Indogermanisches etymologisches Wörterbuch (IEW, first published 1956 by Julius Pokorny), with reconstructions pre-dating the laryngeal theory
 Indo-European Etymological Dictionary, an ongoing project based in Leiden, intended to result in the publication of a comprehensive Indo-European etymological dictionary
 Nomina im Indogermanischen Lexikon (NIL), structured similarly to the LIV and treating PIE nouns and adjectives
 Lexikon der indogermanischen Partikeln und Pronominalstämme (LIPP), structured similarly to the LIV and treating PIE particles and pronouns.

References

External links 

Addenda und Corrigenda zu LIV². HTML or PDF. Latest update: 3 Feb. 2015.
Pokorny PIE Data (University of Texas)
Indogermanisches Wörterbuch by Gerhard Köbler  (based on the IEW and including laryngeal-based reconstructions, but only as alternative lemmas with cross references to the pre-laryngeal ones)

1998 non-fiction books
Indo-European linguistics works
Etymological dictionaries